The Brewcity Bruisers is a women's flat-track roller derby league based in Milwaukee, Wisconsin. Founded in 2005, the league played their tenth season in 2016. The Bruisers are a member of the Women's Flat Track Derby Association (WFTDA).

History and organization
Brewcity Bruisers was founded in late 2005 by skaters "Jesse Jameson", "Butch Cassidy" and "Cris Carny Power", and was announced as a new member of the Women's Flat Track Derby Association in May 2007. By 2011 the league was drawing over 3500 people to an event at U.S. Cellular Arena.

The Brewcity Bruisers home league is composed of four home teams, the Crazy 8s, the Maiden Milwaukee, the Shevil Knevils, and the Rushin' Rollettes. Brewcity also has two travel teams, the All-Stars A-Team and the Battlestars B-team. The league is supported by a cheer/dance team called the Brewcity Beerleaders, as well as a group of skating referees and NSOs (Non-Skating Officials).

WFTDA competition
In 2009 Brewcity was the ninth seed at the WFTDA North Central Regional Tournament and finished in seventh place after an overtime victory over Burning River Roller Girls, 126-116. Brewcity was the fifth seed at the 2010 North Central Playoff, but finished in eighth place following a 138-84 loss to North Star Rollergirls. As the seventh seed in 2011, Brewcity finished in seventh place with a 157-99 victory over Cincinnati Rollergirls. Brewcity was the ninth seed at the final North Central Playoff in 2012, and improved to a sixth-place finish, ending with a 222-61 loss to Detroit Derby Girls.

In 2013, the WFTDA changed their playoff structure, and Brewcity qualified for the WFTDA Division 2 International Playoff tournament in Des Moines, Iowa as the second seed, ultimately finishing in sixth place. Brewcity returned to Division 2 Playoffs in 2014 as the fourth seed in Duluth, and finished in seventh place with a 186-174 victory over Brandywine Roller Girls. In 2015, Brewcity was the ninth seed at Division 2 Playoffs in Detroit, but lost all three of their games to finish in tenth place.

Rankings

References

External links
Bruisers Official Website

Roller derby leagues in Wisconsin
Women's sports in the United States
Sports in Milwaukee
Roller derby leagues established in 2005
2005 establishments in Wisconsin